Helen "Sis" Waddell-Wyatt (born April 24, 1930) played for the All-American Girls Professional Baseball League (AAGPBL) from 1949 to 1951. She both threw and batted right-handed in outfield, and utility infield positions.

Early life and family
Waddell was born in Lemoyne, Pennsylvania. She had five older brothers, who she claimed, "beat the hell out of [her]," toughening her up which helped her with her baseball. She married Neil Wyatt in 1951. They were married for 53 years and had two sons.

Baseball career
After trying out for the AAGPBL in 1949, she was assigned to spring training for the South Bend Blue Sox. She never played for South Bend, being traded to the Rockford Peaches just before the start of the 1950 season. Waddell played with the Springfield Sallies (1949), the Rockford Peaches (1950, 1951) and the Battle Creek Belles (1951). When she played for the Rockford Peaches, the team was managed by Bill Allington.  She played second base for the Peaches when they won the All-American Girls Professional Baseball title in 1951.

Career statistics

Sources

External links
 Journal Standard 
 Rock River Times 
 Quad Cities Online 

All-American Girls Professional Baseball League players
1930 births
Living people
21st-century American women